Euborellia jeekeli is a species of earwig in the family Anisolabididae.

See also
 List of Dermapterans of Australia

References

Anisolabididae
Insects described in 1985